Mammillaria karwinskiana is a species of cacti in the tribe Cacteae. It is native to Mexico.

Gallery

References

External links
 Mammillaria karwinskiana at Tropicos

Plants described in 1832
karwinskiana